Khwajgipur is a village in Bijnor district in Uttar Pradesh state, India. It is near the villages of Ramjiwala, Bahadarpur-Jat, Bilaspur (Sadakpur) and Kishanpur. The population of this village is about 150.

References

Villages in Bijnor district